The 1903 Lewisham by-election was a by-election held on 15 December 1903 for the British House of Commons constituency of Lewisham.

The by-election was triggered by the death of the serving Conservative Party Member of Parliament (MP), John Penn.

The Unionist candidate was Major Edward Coates. The Liberal Party candidate was James William Cleland.

As with the Dulwich by-election held on the same day, the main issue was tariff reform and Joseph Chamberlain's proposals for Imperial Preference. A factor which made the result of the by election difficult to predict was that the seat had not been contested since 1892 and in that time the population had doubled in size. The additional residents, according to the Times, were mainly "City men, with comparatively small incomes".

In the event, the result was a comfortable win for the Unionist candidate.

Result

References 

 The Times, 16 December 1903

See also 
 List of United Kingdom by-elections
 Lewisham constituency

Lewisham,1903
Lewisham by-election
Lewisham,1903
Lewisham by-election